Sam Wang is a Taiwanese actor, singer and a model. Sam is a member of two Taiwanese groups 5566 and 183 Club. At one point, he played on the Taiwan national soccer team.

Biography
Sam Wang Shao Wei started playing Soccer when the class 3 primary schools started the Soccer program. His achievements in Soccer are equal to those in the entertainment field. He played 13 years of Soccer. Before his 5566 debut in 2002, every Soccer match in Taiwan both big and small, featured Wang Shao Wei on its players list. On June 26, 2002, Shao Wei became the Soccer coach for one of the community activities Soccer teams. Shao Wei showed some kung fu soccer steps. As an artist, he helped improve the positive reputation of Taiwanese Soccer. His managing company (Jungiery) worked with him to help balance his soccer and entertainment activities.

In 2004, Shao Wei released a book called 明星入門100招 (100 Ways To Become A Star).

In December 2007, Wang Shao Wei promoted 5566's album, Bravo, in Singapore.

On November 18, 2007, fans helped him celebrate his 31st birthday, and unexpectedly gave him a 2 million dollar Lexus Alphard as a birthday present. Wang Shao Wei turned down this gift, but took a picture of it as a remembrance.

(It is reported that many Wang Shao Wei fans coming from wealthy family backgrounds.  An American fan once flew from the US to Indonesia when Shao Wei participated an activity there, and gave him round trip airplane tickets to Hawaii.)

In March 2008 he changed his name from 王绍偉 to 王少偉 (the reading is still the same).

In 2008, Shao wei launched his first bakery shop, named Uncle Sam. The breads from his shop are imported from US. Besides selling bread, he also sells merchandise such as T-shirts, soft toys of characters designed by him.  The same year he appeared in the movie Drifting Flowers.

In 2009, he launched his second shop- Uncle Sam's Junior, a branch of Uncle Sam's Bakery Cafe.

Filmography

Television series
{| class="wikitable" style="font-size: 95%;"
! Year !! Title !! Role
|-
| 2011 || They Are Flying ||
|-
| 2011 ||  / Wives || Jiang Hao / 江皓
|-
| 2009 ||  / Magic 18 || Zhu Yao Wu / 朱耀武
|-
| 2009 ||  / '' ||
|-
| 2008 ||  / Your Home is My Home || Shi Mai Ke / 石麦克 / Michael
|-
| 2007 ||  / Mean Girl Ah Chu || Ling Ping Zhi / 凌平之
|-
| 2006 ||  / A Game About Love || Wei Qi Xiang / 韋祺祥
|-
| 2006 ||  / The Magicians of Love || Lin Er Qi / 林爾奇/ Richie
|-
| 2005 ||  / The Prince Who Turns into a Frog || Xu Zi Qian / 徐子騫
|-
| 2005 ||  / Mr Fighting || (Guest Appearance)
|-
| 2004 ||  / In Love with a Rich Girl || (Guest Appearance)
|-
| 2004 ||  / Top on the Forbidden City || Fire
|-
| 2003 ||  / 100% Senorita || (Guest Appearance)
|-
| 2003 ||  / Westside Story || Gu Tian Le / 辜天樂
|-
| 2002 ||  / My MVP Valentine || Shao Wei / 紹偉
|-
| 1998 ||  / Ceng Jing || Yuen Ming Gan / 袁明剛
|-
|}

 Films 
 Eternal Flower (2018)
 My Dad Is a Superstar (2013)
 Delicacy Gambling King'' (2009)

References

 Uncle Sam's Bakery Cafe

External links
 
 

1976 births
Living people
5566 members
183 Club members
Taiwanese male television actors
Taiwanese male models
Businesspeople in the food industry
Taiwanese idols
21st-century Taiwanese singers